Corbally is the name of several places in Ireland, including:
 Corbally, County Cork, a civil parish in County Cork
 Corbally, County Down, a townland in County Down
 Corbally, County Dublin, a large townland near Tallaght in County Dublin
 Corbally, County Limerick, a townland and suburban area outside Limerick city

See also
 Daly Castle, formerly known as "Corbally", a ruined castle in County Galway